Linton is a suburb of Palmerston North, situated 11km south-west of the city.

The Linton Military Camp, the largest army camp in New Zealand, was built in 1945 3.5 kilometres to the south-east of Palmerston North. It became the country’s second largest base in 1985 when the permanent force at Singapore was relocated there. More units have transferred from Auckland  and Waiouru. It features a community library, which is available to the local community.

Manawatu Prison is also located in Linton.

History

Linton is named for James Linton, an early settler in the area, and also twice Mayor of Palmerston North. The Scotsman was one of the first European settlers in Palmerston. He and his wife, Sarah, arrived on horseback from Wairarapa early in 1871. Linton served as mayor of Palmerston North 1879-82 and 1884-5, and was a director and ardent promoter of the Wellington and Manawatu Railway Company.

The site of the original planned Linton township is several kilometres away from current army camp, at the location of a Wellington and Manawatu Railway Company station on the Wellington ‒ Longburn railway line. Along with several other directors of this private company, James Linton was honoured by having a railway station settlement on the line named after him. The line, opened in 1886, was a successful venture, but the Linton township did not develop. In 1889, a school was established, and St Columba's Church, which serve the small farming community. 

The site of the Linton Military Camp was bought by the New Zealand Government in October 1941. Tents for the 2 Field Regiment formed the first accommodation on this site in February 1942, but within six months the first prefabricated huts were being built. The first housing blocks for officers were constructed in 1955.

In 1985 Linton became New Zealand’s largest military camp, when the permanent force then stationed in Singapore was withdrawn and accommodated at Linton. It has grown even bigger since then with the transfer of frontline units from Auckland and Waiouru. The site purchased for Linton Military Camp included an area by the Manawatu River which had been a major Rangitane Maori village known as Te Kairanga (the place where much food is gathered) but by the 1940s the name was in common use for the district on the other side of the river. Instead the camp took the name of Linton.

Prior to 1996, Linton was part of the Manawatu electorate. However, due to the reformation of the electoral system from FPP to MMP, the electorate of Palmerston North's boundaries were redrawn to include Linton. In 2007, the boundaries were redrawn and Linton was shifted into the Rangitikei electorate.

Until 2013, Linton was part of the Ashhurst-Fitzherbert Ward of Palmerston North City Council, alongside Aokautere and Turitea.

Demographics

It had a population of 1,227 at the 2018 New Zealand census, an increase of 42 people (3.5%) since the 2013 census, and an increase of 138 people (12.7%) since the 2006 census. There were 414 households. There were 648 males and 582 females, giving a sex ratio of 1.11 males per female. The median age was 39.2 years (compared with 37.4 years nationally), with 261 people (21.3%) aged under 15 years, 225 (18.3%) aged 15 to 29, 603 (49.1%) aged 30 to 64, and 141 (11.5%) aged 65 or older.

Ethnicities were 88.5% European/Pākehā, 11.5% Māori, 1.7% Pacific peoples, 4.6% Asian, and 3.7% other ethnicities (totals add to more than 100% since people could identify with multiple ethnicities).

The proportion of people born overseas was 18.6%, compared with 27.1% nationally.

Although some people objected to giving their religion, 55.3% had no religion, 34.2% were Christian, 0.5% were Hindu, 0.5% were Muslim, 0.7% were Buddhist and 1.2% had other religions.

Of those at least 15 years old, 297 (30.7%) people had a bachelor or higher degree, and 105 (10.9%) people had no formal qualifications. The median income was $44,000, compared with $31,800 nationally. The employment status of those at least 15 was that 561 (58.1%) people were employed full-time, 174 (18.0%) were part-time, and 24 (2.5%) were unemployed.

Education

References 

Suburbs of Palmerston North
Populated places in Manawatū-Whanganui